Matthias Abele von und zu Lilienberg (17 February 1618 – 14 November, 1677) brother of Christoph Ignaz Abele, was a mine official and jurist in Steyr, Austria. He acquired his doctorate in law, was comes palatinus (i.e., an imperial count palatine) and in 1652 member of the Fruchtbringende Gesellschaft (Fruitbearing Society).

He published anecdotes in the style of a court case, namely:
Metamorphosis telae judiciariae, 1651, 1668, 1712
Vivat Unordnung!, 1669, 1670-1675
Fiscologia oder Communitätscasse zu Grillenberg, 1672

References
 Allgemeine Deutsche Biographie - online version
 David Murray (2005). Lawyer's merriments.

1618 births
1677 deaths
17th-century Austrian lawyers
Imperial counts palatine